Success was a small settlement in Fairview Township, Russell County, Kansas, United States.

History
Success was issued a post office in 1878. The post office was discontinued in 1909.

References

Former populated places in Russell County, Kansas
Former populated places in Kansas